Associated Aviation Flight 361 was a domestic charter flight operated  by Associated Aviation that on 3 October 2013 crashed on takeoff from Lagos, Nigeria, killing 16 of the 20 people on board. The aircraft, a twin turboprop Embraer 120 Brasilia, was transporting the body of Nigerian politician Olusegun Agagu to Akure, Nigeria, for burial.

Accident
The aircraft was conveying the body of former governor of Ondo State Olusegun Agagu from Lagos to Akure for burial. It lifted off from runway 18L of Murtala Mohammed Airport at about 09:32 local time (08:32 UTC). The crew received warnings from the aircraft's aural warning system during the takeoff-roll and also failed to make "V1" and "rotate" calls; the aircraft then struggled to gain altitude immediately after takeoff. Less than a minute after lifting off, the aircraft impacted terrain in a nose-down-and-near-90-degrees-bank attitude.

Reports differ but according to the manifest the flight had 13 passengers and seven crew; four passengers and two crew survived the accident but one of passengers later died in hospital. Fatalities included relatives of Olusegun Agagu; and officials of the Ondo State Government. An elaborate burial ceremony planned for Agagu was postponed as a result of the crash.

Aircraft
The aircraft used for the flight was an Embraer EMB 120 Brasilia, registered 5N-BJY. It was delivered to Associated Aviation in May 2007.

Investigation

Nigeria's Accident Investigation Bureau (AIB), responsible for investigating air crashes, opened an investigation into the fatal accident.
On 11 October 2013, the AIB released a preliminary report suggesting that improperly configured flaps for takeoff might have led to the crash. The report also reveals that the No. 1 engine appeared to be working normally whilst the No. 2 engine produced significantly less thrust.

References

External links
 Preliminary report, no longer available (Archive) - Accident Investigation Bureau
 Final report

Aviation accidents and incidents in 2013
Aviation accidents and incidents in Nigeria
Accidents and incidents involving the Embraer EMB 120 Brasilia
2013 in Nigeria
October 2013 events in Nigeria
Airliner accidents and incidents caused by engine failure
2013 disasters in Nigeria